Mangudi is a panchayat town in Pudukkottai district  in the state of Tamil Nadu, India.

Geography
It has an average elevation of 128 metres (419 feet).

Demographics
 India census, Mangudi had a population of 1574. Males constitute 47% of the population and females 54%. Annavasal has an average literacy rate of 64%, higher than the national average of 59.5%; with 55% of the males and 45% of females literate. 14% of the population is under 6 years of age.

Schools in Mangudi
 Government High School

Hospitals
 Government Hospital - Annavasal
 Government Hospital - mangudi

References

Cities and towns in Pudukkottai district